The 1928 All-Pro Team consisted of American football players chosen by various selectors for the All-Pro team of the National Football League (NFL) for the 1928 NFL season. Teams were selected by, among others, the Green Bay Press-Gazette (GB), based on the results of a questionnaires sent to the league managers and reporters, and the Chicago Tribune (CT).

The Chicago Tribune picked quarterback Benny Friedman as the captain of its team, calling him "not only a great player but a magnificent showman," "a great passer and a field general par excellence."

Team

References

All-Pro Teams
1928 National Football League season